Pure mathematics is the study of mathematical concepts independently of any application outside mathematics. These concepts may originate in real-world concerns, and the results obtained may later turn out to be useful for practical applications, but pure mathematicians are not primarily motivated by such applications. Instead, the appeal is attributed to the intellectual challenge and aesthetic beauty of working out the logical consequences of basic principles.

While pure mathematics has existed as an activity since at least Ancient Greece, the concept was elaborated upon around the year 1900, after the introduction of theories with counter-intuitive properties (such as non-Euclidean geometries and Cantor's theory of infinite sets), and the discovery of apparent paradoxes (such as continuous functions that are nowhere differentiable, and Russell's paradox). This introduced the need to renew the concept of mathematical rigor and rewrite all mathematics accordingly, with a systematic use of axiomatic methods. This led many mathematicians to focus on mathematics for its own sake, that is, pure mathematics.

Nevertheless, almost all mathematical theories remained motivated by problems coming from the real world or from less abstract mathematical theories. Also, many mathematical theories, which had seemed to be totally pure mathematics, were eventually used in applied areas, mainly physics and computer science. A famous early example is Isaac Newton's demonstration that his law of universal gravitation implied that planets move in orbits that are conic sections, geometrical curves that had been studied in antiquity by Apollonius. Another example is the problem of factoring large integers, which is the basis of the RSA cryptosystem, widely used to secure internet communications.

It follows that, presently, the distinction between pure and applied mathematics is more a philosophical point of view or a mathematician's preference rather than a rigid subdivision of mathematics. In particular, it is not uncommon that some members of a department of applied mathematics describe themselves as pure mathematicians.

History

Ancient Greece
Ancient Greek mathematicians were among the earliest to make a distinction between pure and applied mathematics. Plato helped to create the gap between "arithmetic", now called number theory, and "logistic", now called arithmetic. Plato regarded logistic (arithmetic) as appropriate for businessmen and men of war who "must learn the art of numbers or [they] will not know how to array [their] troops" and arithmetic (number theory) as appropriate for philosophers "because [they have] to arise out of the sea of change and lay hold of true being." Euclid of Alexandria, when asked by one of his students of what use was the study of geometry, asked his slave to give the student threepence, "since he must make gain of what he learns." The Greek mathematician Apollonius of Perga was asked about the usefulness of some of his theorems in Book IV of Conics to which he proudly asserted,
They are worthy of acceptance for the sake of the demonstrations themselves, in the same way as we accept many other things in mathematics for this and for no other reason.
And since many of his results were not applicable to the science or engineering of his day, Apollonius further argued in the preface of the fifth book of Conics that the subject is one of those that "...seem worthy of study for their own sake."

19th century
The term itself is enshrined in the full title of the Sadleirian Chair, "Sadleirian Professor of Pure Mathematics", founded (as a professorship) in the mid-nineteenth century. The idea of a separate discipline of pure mathematics may have emerged at that time. The generation of Gauss made no sweeping distinction of the kind, between pure and applied. In the following years, specialisation and professionalisation (particularly in the Weierstrass approach to mathematical analysis) started to make a rift more apparent.

20th century
At the start of the twentieth century mathematicians took up the axiomatic method, strongly influenced by David Hilbert's example. The logical formulation of pure mathematics suggested by Bertrand Russell in terms of a quantifier structure of propositions seemed more and more plausible, as large parts of mathematics became axiomatised and thus subject to the simple criteria of rigorous proof.

Pure mathematics, according to a view that can be ascribed to the Bourbaki group, is what is proved. "Pure mathematician" became a recognized vocation, achievable through training.

The case was made that pure mathematics is useful in engineering education:

There is a training in habits of thought, points of view, and intellectual comprehension of ordinary engineering problems, which only the study of higher mathematics can give.

Generality and abstraction

One central concept in pure mathematics is the idea of generality; pure mathematics often exhibits a trend towards increased generality. Uses and advantages of generality include the following:

 Generalizing theorems or mathematical structures can lead to deeper understanding of the original theorems or structures
 Generality can simplify the presentation of material, resulting in shorter proofs or arguments that are easier to follow.
 One can use generality to avoid duplication of effort, proving a general result instead of having to prove separate cases independently, or using results from other areas of mathematics.
 Generality can facilitate connections between different branches of mathematics. Category theory is one area of mathematics dedicated to exploring this commonality of structure as it plays out in some areas of math.

Generality's impact on intuition is both dependent on the subject and a matter of personal preference or learning style.  Often generality is seen as a hindrance to intuition, although it can certainly function as an aid to it, especially when it provides analogies to material for which one already has good intuition.

As a prime example of generality, the Erlangen program involved an expansion of geometry to accommodate non-Euclidean geometries as well as the field of topology, and other forms of geometry, by viewing geometry as the study of a space together with a group of transformations.  The study of numbers, called algebra at the beginning undergraduate level, extends to abstract algebra at a more advanced level; and the study of functions, called calculus at the college freshman level becomes mathematical analysis and functional analysis at a more advanced level.  Each of these branches of more abstract mathematics have many sub-specialties, and there are in fact many connections between pure mathematics and applied mathematics disciplines. A steep rise in abstraction was seen mid 20th century.

In practice, however, these developments led to a sharp divergence from physics, particularly from 1950 to 1983. Later this was criticised, for example by Vladimir Arnold, as too much Hilbert, not enough Poincaré. The point does not yet seem to be settled, in that string theory pulls one way, while discrete mathematics pulls back towards proof as central.

Pure vs. applied mathematics
Mathematicians have always had differing opinions regarding the distinction between pure and applied mathematics. One of the most famous (but perhaps misunderstood) modern examples of this debate can be found in G.H. Hardy's 1940 essay A Mathematician's Apology.  The word "apology" in this instance refers to the archaic definition of "defense" or "explanation," as in Plato's Apology.

It is widely believed that Hardy considered applied mathematics to be ugly and dull. Although it is true that Hardy preferred pure mathematics, which he often compared to painting and poetry, Hardy saw the distinction between pure and applied mathematics to be simply that applied mathematics sought to express physical truth in a mathematical framework, whereas pure mathematics expressed truths that were independent of the physical world. Hardy made a separate distinction in mathematics between what he called "real" mathematics, "which has permanent aesthetic value", and "the dull and elementary parts of mathematics" that have practical use.

Hardy considered some physicists, such as Einstein and Dirac, to be among the "real" mathematicians, but at the time that he was writing his Apology, he considered general relativity and quantum mechanics to be "useless", which allowed him to hold the opinion that only "dull" mathematics was useful. Moreover, Hardy briefly admitted that—just as the application of matrix theory and group theory to physics had come unexpectedly—the time may come where some kinds of beautiful, "real" mathematics may be useful as well.

Another insightful view is offered by American mathematician Andy Magid:

Friedrich Engels argued in his 1878 book Anti-Dühring that "it is not at all true that in pure mathematics the mind deals only with its own creations and imaginations. The concepts of number and figure have not been invented from any source other than the world of reality". He further argued that "Before one came upon the idea of deducing the form of a cylinder from the rotation of a rectangle about one of its sides, a number of real rectangles and cylinders, however imperfect in form, must have been examined. Like all other sciences, mathematics arose out of the needs of men...But, as in every department of thought, at a certain stage of development the laws, which were abstracted from the real world, become divorced from the real world, and are set up against it as something independent, as laws coming from outside, to which the world has to conform."

See also

Applied mathematics
Logic
Metalogic
Metamathematics

References

External links

What is Pure Mathematics? – Department of Pure Mathematics, University of Waterloo
The Principles of Mathematics by Bertrand Russell

Fields of mathematics
Abstraction